The 2019–20 Eastern Kentucky Colonels men's basketball team represented Eastern Kentucky University during the 2019–20 NCAA Division I men's basketball season. The Colonels, led by second-year head coach A. W. Hamilton, played their home games at McBrayer Arena within Alumni Coliseum as members of the Ohio Valley Conference. They finished the season 16–17, 12–6 in OVC play to finish in fourth place. They defeated Tennessee State in the quarterfinals before losing to Belmont in the semifinals.

Previous season
The Colonels finished the season 2018–19 season 13–18, 6–12 in OVC play to finish in a four-way tie for sixth place. Due to tie-breaking rules, they failed to qualify to play in the OVC tournament for the fourth consecutive season.

Roster

Schedule and Results

|-
!colspan=12 style=| Exhibition

|-
!colspan=12 style=| Regular season

|-
!colspan=12 style=| Ohio Valley Conference regular season

|-
!colspan=12 style=|Ohio Valley tournament

Sources

References

Eastern Kentucky
Eastern Kentucky Colonels men's basketball seasons
Eastern Kentucky
Eastern Kentucky